An Triúr Deirféar (The Three Sisters in Irish) are a group of three peaks at the northwestern end of the Dingle Peninsula in County Kerry, Ireland.

Geography 
The hills are situated just to the north of the village of Baile an Fheirtéaraigh. Binn Diarmada elevation is 153 m.

Etymology 
The names of the little peaks are from the westerly most hill, Binn Hanrai, Binn Meanach and Binn Diarmada. Though they are called "the three sisters", none of them has a female name associated with it.

Notes 

Mountains and hills of County Kerry